The 1999 Kansas City Royals season involved the Royals finishing 4th in the American League Central with a record of 64 wins and 97 losses.

Offseason
 October 30, 1998: Rico Rossy was signed as a free agent by the Royals.

Regular season
Mark Quinn hit two home runs in his major league debut.

Season standings

Record vs. opponents

Notable transactions
 July 31, 1999: Kevin Appier was traded by the Royals to the Oakland Athletics for Jeff D'Amico, Brad Rigby and Blake Stein.

Roster

Player stats

Batting

Starters by position 
Note: Pos = Position; G = Games played; AB = At bats; H = Hits; Avg. = Batting average; HR = Home runs; RBI = Runs batted in

Other batters 
Note: G = Games played; AB = At bats; H = Hits; Avg. = Batting average; HR = Home runs; RBI = Runs batted in

Pitching

Starting pitchers 
Note: G = Games pitched; IP = Innings pitched; W = Wins; L = Losses; ERA = Earned run average; SO = Strikeouts

Other pitchers 
Note: G = Games pitched; IP = Innings pitched; W = Wins; L = Losses; ERA = Earned run average; SO = Strikeouts

Relief pitchers 
Note: G = Games pitched; W = Wins; L = Losses; SV = Saves; ERA = Earned run average; SO = Strikeouts

Farm system 

LEAGUE CHAMPIONS: Wichita, Spokane; LEAGUE CO-CHAMPIONS: Wilmington

References

1999 Kansas City Royals at Baseball Reference
1999 Kansas City Royals at Baseball Almanac

Kansas City Royals seasons
Kansas City Royals season
Kansas